Marneen Lynne Fields is an actress, musician, and former stuntwoman. She has appeared in over 150 movies and TV episodes as an actress, stuntwoman, or both. She has been noted as one of the prominent stuntwomen of the 1970s and 1980s.

Due to her performance as Curry in Hellhole, as well as her acting roles in other films and TV series episodes, she is said to be the first stuntwoman to be cast in a significant role as an actress. Her turn from stuntwoman to actress was also noted in a 1988 Star magazine article.

Early life 
Fields's mother Ruby was an aspiring author and songwriter.

Her father Robert was a country-western square dance caller on local TV in Minot, and later worked as a crop dusting pilot. When Marneen was around 12 years old, the family moved from North Dakota to southern California, where her father worked as a service manager at Santa Monica Airport. He later opened his own business, Bob Fields Aviation, at Van Nuys Airport. He also founded the Bob Fields Aerocessories Company.

In 1972 she created and opened the first Simi Valley Parks and Recreations program in gymnastics for children and adults of all ages including the handicapped The same year she lost all the hearing in her left ear due to a throat infection. Fields continued to coach gymnastics throughout college and during her early career as a stunt woman.

In 1973 she graduated with honors from Royal High School in Simi Valley, California becoming one of three women in the United States to receive a full ride athletic-academic scholarship in gymnastics to Utah State University in Logan, Utah. Fields competed as the only class one advanced all-around gymnast for USU. She was ranked third in the entire state of Utah and ranked third in floor exercise and fifth in balance beam in intercollegiate competition (1973-1976). She majored in Health Education and minored in Theater Arts. Her college gymnastics career was cut short due to a fall off the balance beam during competition resulting in a serious injury to ligaments of her right ankle. The injury resulted in a complete ankle reconstruction surgery in 1976 where a calf's tendon was inserted into her ankle to replace the torn ligaments. She moved home to Ventura, California to heal from the ankle operation.

Film career

During the summer of 1976, she was home from college in Ventura, California recovering from the ankle reconstruction surgery when she was discovered by stuntman Paul Stader (Cary Grant's double). Marneen trained to become a Hollywood stuntwoman at his stunt school. By December 1976 she landed her first acting role as one of the schoolmates in The Spell. By 1977 she was a regular stunt performer on the TV series, The Man from Atlantis. For fifteen years, Fields appeared in TV shows and movie.

Some of the film and TV shows Fields has appeared in and the actresses she did stunts for are: Jane Seymour Battlestar Galactica, Priscilla Presley The Fall Guy, Shirley Jones Beyond the Poseidon Adventure, Michelle Phillips The Man with Bogart's Face, Morgan Fairchild Time Express, Belinda Montgomery The Man from Atlantis, Mary Crosby Dynasty, Samantha Doane The Gauntlet, Linda Purl Matlock, Natasha Richardson Patty Hearst, Karen Black Police Story: Confessions of a Lady Cop, Linda Hamilton Murder She Wrote, Melanie Griffith She's in the Army Now, Tovah Feldshuh Terror out of the Sky, Dee Wallace The Howling, Kim Cattrall The Hardy Boys/Nancy Drew Mysteries, Barbara Hershey From Here to Eternity, and Heather Menzies Logan's Run.

Fields was also cast in more stunt actress jobs by directors like Stanley Kramer The Runner Stumbles, Irwin Allen The Swarm, Peter Medak Otherworld, and James Fargo Scarecrow and Mrs. King.

In the mid-80s she became the first woman to come from the pure stunt arena to land the co-star role in the Arkoff International Production of Hellhole as the religious insanity victim who receives a chemical lobotomy.

Music career 

Fields sang REM's "Everybody Hurts" and won the G.O.D. Award in Music, the title song for the 2013 documentary, We Can Take Some of the Hurt Away produced by cinematographer Roydon Johnson, a charity film about poverty to help fund education situations for children in Indonesia. Fields also received a Best Female Vocalist of the Year nomination from the LA Music Awards for her recording of "Everybody Hurts." The instrumental track was arranged by Ben Hammer, with the song produced by Tom Weir of Studio City Sound.

Fields "Kathryn Davis: Take 2" won Most Inspirational Song the Best of Las Vegas from the Las Vegas Fame Awards, and Most Inspirational Song the Best of Hollywood from the Hollywood Fame Awards in 2017. The song is the title track to a TV sitcom she created and stars in with the same name. The pilot episode of the sitcom received a Producers Choice Honor from the LA Comedy Awards. Marneen was a co-lyricist on the song that was composed by Rory Wolman of Shine Records.

Fields composed "I'm Gonna Be a Hollywood Stuntman" in 2012, the title track to a feature film she's written titled "Johnny Hawk AKA Hard Nuts to Crack," Winner of Outstanding Comedy Script from the LA Comedy Awards 2015. Marneen produced the music video to "I'm Gonna Be a Hollywood Stuntman" that was nominated for Best Children's/Young Adult Film from the International Action on Film Festival 2017. "I'm Gonna Be a Hollywood Stuntman" with American Idol contestant, Christian Etter Johnson on lead vocals and Marneen on female vocals hit the number one spot on the Soundclick Music Internet Charts twice in the Country-Pop and Country categories beating out 50,000 other songs. The song was produced by Tom Weir of Studio City Sound.

On August 5, 2018, Marneen won Best Single from the LANFA Nollywood Awards for her pop-rock-blues ballad about a tormented poet who commits suicide, "I'll Never Kiss His Lips Again" with the song produced by Steve Valenzuela on Kelly Clarkson's "Greatest Hits Volume One."

On July 15, 2018, Marneen won a Best Pop Single of the Year nomination from the Atlas Elite Music Entertainment Awards for her pop ballad about a tyrannical actor who breaks a young starlets heart, "Standing Ovation! You're the Star!" with the song produced by Steve Valenzuela on Kelly Clarkson's "Greatest Hits Volume One."

Author career 

In 2018, Fields published her nonfiction book, The Illusive Craft of Acting: An Actor's Preparation Process.

Fields will publish two books in 2019, Cartwheels & Halos: The True Marneen Lynne Fields Story, and Rollin' with the Punches: An Examination of the Stunt and Acting Careers of Marneen Fields.

Partial filmography

Partial televisionography

Discography

Selected songs 

 Everybody Hurts
 Shadows
 Release My Love
 I've Never Ever Stopped Loving You
 Unbelievable, Love At First Sight
 Special Man
 Heavenly Waterfall Songs (Theme Song)
 We Can Take Some of the Hurt Away
 Kathryn Davis - Take 2
 Standing Ovation You're the Star
 I'm Gonna Be a Hollywood Stuntman
 Heavenly Waterfall Songs

References

External links 
 

American film actresses
American television actresses
Actresses from North Dakota
People from Minot, North Dakota
People from Ward County, North Dakota
Living people
American stunt performers
University of Utah alumni
21st-century American women
Year of birth missing (living people)